Transnational authoritarianism represents any effort to prevent acts of political dissent against an authoritarian state by targeting one or more existing or potential members of its emigrant or diaspora communities. A range of states engage in these actions, from Soviet and Russian assassinations to forced disappearances of Chinese and Hong Kong citizens abroad. A recent Freedom House report details the extensive use of transnational authoritarianism by a rising number of countries across the world.

Political scientists have identified that autocracies face specific challenges and opportunities in the international sphere that affect authoritarian practices. Specifically, the rise of transnationalism and practices that transcend national borders has led autocracies to develop strategies aiming to manage their citizens' migration. According to political scientist Gerasimos Tsourapas, global autocracies engage in complex strategies of transnational repression, legitimation, and co-optation as well as cooperation with non-state actors. Sociologist Dana M. Moss has argued for a typology of transnational authoritarianism, as described below.

Actors 
A number of actors; principally countries governed by authoritiarian states are known to engage in transnational repression of dissident and diaspora communities abroad including but not limited to: China, Saudi Arabia, Rwanda, Turkey and Iran.

Typology of transnational authoritarianism

See also

References

Further reading 
 Tansey, Oisín. The International Politics of Authoritarian Rule. Oxford: Oxford University Press, 2016.
Brand, Laurie A. Citizens Abroad: Emigration and the State in the Middle East and North Africa. Cambridge: Cambridge University Press, 2006.

 Political systems
Authoritarianism